Gomibai Jawaharmal Ladies Club, also known as Ladies Club, Larkana, is a women's social club located in Larkana, Sindh, Pakistan.

History
The club was built by a Hindu deputy collector who named it after his sister and it was inaugurated in 1934 by the wife of RE Gibson, a British administrator.

Controversies 
In 2015, Supreme Court of Pakistan appointed a three-member bench to investigate the illegal occupation of land belonging to the club.

References

Larkana District
1931 establishments in British India
Clubs and societies in Pakistan